Abu Raja Al-Sindi (Arabic: ابو راجه السندي) (d. 321 AH/d. 10th century AD) was an Arabic scholar of  Sindhi origin in what is now Pakistan. He specialised in the study of Quran, Hadith and Arab literature. He was also a teacher of Arab scholars, administrators and travellers to Sindh.

References

10th-century Muslim scholars of Islam
Sindhi people
History of Sindh
Sindhi-language writers
Sindhi scholars